Pedicularis kaufmannii is a species of flowering plant belonging to the family Orobanchaceae.

It is native to Eurasia.

References

kaufmannii